Nelson Joel Fry (born June 18, 1974) is the Iowa State Representative from the 24th District.  A Republican, he has served in the Iowa House of Representatives since 2011.  Fry was born in Des Moines, Iowa and was raised and resides in Osceola.  He has a B.A. from Simpson College a M.S.W. and an Aging Studies Certificate from the University of Iowa School of Social Work.

, Fry serves on several committees in the Iowa House – the Administration and Rules, Education, Human Resources, Labor, and Public Safety committees.  He also serves as an Assistant Leader for the House Republican caucus.

Biography 
Fry was born in Des Moines, Iowa, and raised in Osceola. He is a strong advocate for the rights of adoptive parents. He is the adoptive parent of five children.

In 2018, Rep. Fry's brother, Kenny Fry and wife Kelly were arrested on charges stemming from their abuse and neglect of their two children adopted from Ghana. In 2019, the couple pled guilty.

Electoral history 
*incumbent

References

External links 

 Representative Joel Fry official Iowa General Assembly site
 
 Financial information (state office) at the National Institute for Money in State Politics

1974 births
Living people
Simpson College alumni
University of Iowa alumni
Republican Party members of the Iowa House of Representatives
Politicians from Des Moines, Iowa
People from Osceola, Iowa
21st-century American politicians